is a Japanese competitive swimmer and two-time Olympic medalist. He won the bronze medal by swimming the butterfly leg in the 4 × 100 m medley relay at the 2008 Summer Olympics.  He followed this with a silver medal at the 2012 Summer Olympics, again in the medley relay, but this time by swimming the freestyle (anchor) leg.

Personal bests
In long course
 100 m freestyle: 48.73 Asian, Japanese Record (April 16, 2009)
 100 m butterfly: 51.28 Asian, Japanese Record (February 1, 2009)

In short course
 100 m freestyle: 46.85 Asian, Japanese Record (March 8, 2009)

References

External links

 

1985 births
Asian Games bronze medalists for Japan
Asian Games gold medalists for Japan
Asian Games medalists in swimming
Asian Games silver medalists for Japan
Living people
Japanese male butterfly swimmers
Japanese male freestyle swimmers
Medalists at the 2008 Summer Olympics
Medalists at the 2010 Asian Games
Medalists at the 2012 Summer Olympics
Medalists at the 2014 Asian Games
Olympic bronze medalists in swimming
Olympic bronze medalists for Japan
Olympic silver medalists in swimming
Olympic silver medalists for Japan
Olympic swimmers of Japan
People from Kawachinagano
Sportspeople from Osaka Prefecture
Swimmers at the 2008 Summer Olympics
Swimmers at the 2010 Asian Games
Swimmers at the 2012 Summer Olympics
Swimmers at the 2014 Asian Games
Swimmers at the 2016 Summer Olympics
World Aquatics Championships medalists in swimming